This article is about music-related events in 1826.

Events 

 Chopin begins to study with Józef Elsner at the Warsaw Conservatory

Published popular music 
 "The Old Oaken Bucket" w. Samuel Woodworth m. George F. Kiallmark.  Words written in 1817.

Classical music 
Ludwig van Beethoven
String Quartet No. 13 in B-flat major, Op. 130
String Quartet No. 14 in C-sharp minor, Op. 131
Muzio Clementi – Complete Gradus ad Parnassum (100 pieces) appears for the first time, simultaneously in Paris, Leipzig and London on October 31.
Johannes Frederik Frøhlich – Concertino for violin and orchestra in D major
Franz Liszt – Initial version of the Étude en douze exercices 
Felix Mendelssohn – Overture "A Midsummer Night's Dream" in E major for orchestra, Op. 21
Giovanni Morandi – Raccolta di Suonate pei grand' Organi Moderni, Op. 21
Niccolò Paganini – Violin Concerto No. 2
Ferdinand Ries 
Piano Concerto No.8, Op.151
Variationen über eine portugiesische Hymne für Pianoforte und Flöte in A major, Op. 152
3 Flute Quartets, WoO 35, No. 1 in D minor
Franz Schubert
Symphony No. 9 in C major "Great"
String Quartet No. 15 in G major
Piano Sonata No. 18 in G major "Fantasie"

Opera 
 John Barnett – Before Breakfast
 Vincenzo Bellini – Bianca e Fernando
 Gaetano Donizetti – Alahor in Granata
 Joseph Augustine Wade – The Two Houses of Granada
Carl Maria von Weber – Oberon, King of the Fairies (first performed in London, libretto by James Robinson Planche).

Births 
January 18 – Joseph-Henri Altès, composer (died 1895)
February 1 – Marie Carandini, opera singer (d. 1894)
February 2 – Louisa Langhans-Japha, composer (died 1910)
February 16 – Franz von Holstein, composer
March 6 – Marietta Alboni, operatic contralto (d. 1894)
March 14 – William Fisk Sherwin, composer
March 23 – Léon Minkus, composer (d. 1917)
April 7 – Johann Hermann Berens, composer (d. 1880)
April 28 – Alexander Stadtfeld, composer
June 1
Carl Bechstein, piano-maker (d. 1900)
Hermann Zopff, composer
July 4 – Stephen Foster, songwriter (d. 1864)
July 8 – Friedrich Chrysander, music historian (d. 1901)
July 22 – Julius Stockhausen, singer and music teacher (d. 1906)
August 13 – William Thomas Best, organist (d. 1897)
August 28 – Walter Cecil Macfarren, pianist and composer
October 13 – Johanna Jachmann-Wagner, operatic mezzo-soprano (d. 1894)
October 14 – Georges Mathias, composer and pianist (d. 1910)
October 16 – Piotr Studzinski, composer
 Mathilda Ebeling, Swedish soprano (died 1851) 
October 22 – Guglielmo Quarenghi, cellist and composer (d. 1882)
December 21 – Ernst Pauer, composer (d. 1905)
December 24 – Ignacy Krzyżanowski, Polish composer (d. 1905)
date unknown – Edward Mack, songwriter (d. 1882)

Deaths 
January 17 – Juan Crisóstomo Arriaga, composer (b. 1806)
February 11 – Charles Benjamin Incledon, singer (b. 1763)
March 14 – Julie Alix de la Fay, ballerina (b. 1748)
March 29 – Johann Heinrich Voss, lyricist (born 1751)
April 3 – Reginald Heber, hymn-writing bishop (b. 1783)
April 13 – Franz Danzi, cellist, conductor and composer (b. 1763)
May 6 – Sophie Hagman, ballerina (b. 1758)
May 24 – Frederic Ernest Fesca, violinist and composer (b. 1789)
May 27 – Carl David Stegmann, singer, harpsichordist, conductor and composer (b. 1751)
June 5 – Carl Maria von Weber, composer (b. 1786)
July 7 – Friedrich Ludwig Dulon, flautist and composer (b. 1768)
July 11 – Carl Bernhard Wessely, composer
August 30 – Theodor Zwetler, composer
September 28 – Dietrich Nikolaus Winkel, inventor of the first working metronome (b. 1780)
October 9 – Michael Kelly, actor, singer and composer (b. 1762)
November 17 – Caroline Frederikke Müller, operatic mezzo-soprano (b. 1755)
December 3 – Elizabeth Sandunova soprano
December 10 – Benedikt Emanuel Schack, singer and composer (b. 1758)

 
19th century in music
Music by year